Harrison Browne (born Hailey Browne on May 13, 1993) is a Canadian professional ice hockey centre who played for the Metropolitan Riveters and Buffalo Beauts of the National Women's Hockey League (NWHL). Browne was assigned female at birth and played in women's competitions during his ice hockey career; he came out as a transgender man in 2016 and was the first openly transgender athlete in a professional team sport during his career.

Playing career

Hockey Canada 
Browne played for Team Canada at the 2011 IIHF World Women's U18 Championship, appearing in the gold medal game. Among his teammates on Team Canada included future Mercyhurst and Beauts teammates Shelby Bram and Amanda Makela. Browne was also a member of the Ontario provincial team that gained the silver medal at the 2011 Canada Winter Games.

Collegiate 
Browne played one season for the Mercyhurst Lakers before transferring to the University of Maine, playing his remaining collegiate years with the Black Bears. Browne's NCAA debut took place on September 30, 2011, with the Mercyhurst Lakers in a contest against the Quinnipiac Bobcats. He waited until October 29, 2011, for his first career NCAA goal, scoring against conference rival Lindenwood in a road contest.

Browne's debut with Maine took place against Quinnipiac, with the match held on October 12, 2012. His first goal with Maine also took place on January 19, 2013, against the Vermont Catamounts. The last goal of his NCAA career occurred on February 21, 2015, against the Connecticut Huskies.

Professional 
Browne signed a professional contract with the Buffalo Beauts of the newly formed NWHL on August 29, 2015. In the 2015–16 season, he played in 18 games, scored 5 goals and had 12 points. He played in 5 games in the NWHL postseason, scoring 2 goals and 2 assists.

On May 14, 2016, Browne signed a second one-year contract with the Beauts.

In October 2016, Browne came out publicly as a transgender man and thus became the first openly transgender athlete in professional American hockey; he had previously privately disclosed his gender identity to coaches while playing at Maine. Browne stated that he would not hormonally transition until the end of his professional playing career, as the hormones involved in female-to-male gender transition violate anti-doping regulations.

Playing for Team Kessel, Browne scored two goals at the 2nd NWHL All-Star Game.

On March 14, 2017, Browne announced he would be retiring from the NWHL at the end of the season to begin hormone replacement therapy and continue his gender transition in privacy.

On March 19, 2017, Browne won the Isobel Cup with the Buffalo Beauts, becoming the first openly transgender athlete to win a national championship on a team sport.

On August 7, 2017, he announced he would be putting his retirement on hold and would instead return for the 2017–18 season with the Metropolitan Riveters.

On April 25, 2018, Browne won the Isobel Cup for the second time, this time with the Metropolitan Riveters (the team's first win).

On April 30, 2018, Browne again announced his retirement from the NWHL.

Post-retirement 
Since his retirement from the NWHL, Browne has primarily devoted his time to speaking engagements across North America. He has given talks and spoken on panels at colleges, such as Ohio State University, American University, and Fleming College as well as LGBTQ events, such as Outsports Pride.

In August 2019, Browne announced on his personal Twitter account that he was beginning a new career as an actor. He emphasized that he plans to advocate for more transgender visibility in his new venture as he had in his athletic career.

In 2021, he appeared in one episode of Y: The Last Man.

Career statistics

Regular season and playoffs

References

External links 
 
 
 
 

1993 births
Living people
Canadian ice hockey centres
Buffalo Beauts players
Maine Black Bears women's ice hockey players
Mercyhurst Lakers women's ice hockey players
Metropolitan Riveters players
Premier Hockey Federation players
LGBT ice hockey players
University of Maine alumni
Canadian LGBT sportspeople
Ice hockey people from Ontario
Sportspeople from Oakville, Ontario
Transgender sportsmen